Kerstin is a female German and Swedish given name; it is the European version of Christina.

Notable persons with this name include:
Kerstin Alm (born 1949), Finnish politician from the Åland Islands
Kerstin Anderson (born 1994), American stage actress and singer, most noted for portraying Maria von Trapp in the 2015 US national tour of The Sound of Music
Kerstin Andreae (born 1968), German politician (Alliance 90/The Greens)
Kerstin-Maria Aronsson (born 1937), Swedish politician
Kjerstin Dellert (born 1925), Swedish soprano opera singer
Kerstin Ekman (born 1933), Swedish novelist
Kerstin Garefrekes (born 1979), German footballer
Kerstin Granlund, created the Swedish comedy groups Galenskaparna och After Shave
Kerstin Müller (born 1969), German rower
Kerstin Hilldén (born 1988), Swedish musical theatre actress
Kerstin Ott (born 1982), German musician 
Kerstin Fritzl (born 1988), Austrian false imprisonment survivor
Kerstin Thorborg (1896–1970), Swedish opera singer
Kerstin Thorvall (born 1925), Swedish writer

See also
Kerstin (horse), a Thoroughbred racehorse
842 Kerstin, minor planet orbiting the Sun

Kirsten (given name)
Kristen (given name)
Kristin (name)

References

German feminine given names
Swedish feminine given names